John Conner (born 27 December 1891) was a Scottish professional footballer who played as a forward for Sunderland.

References

1891 births
Sportspeople from Rutherglen
Scottish footballers
Association football forwards
Sunderland A.F.C. players
Lisburn Distillery F.C. players
Crystal Palace F.C. players
Newport County A.F.C. players
Bristol City F.C. players
Millwall F.C. players
Chatham Town F.C. players
Yeovil Town F.C. players
Southend United F.C. players
English Football League players
Year of death missing
Footballers from South Lanarkshire